Brice Harvey Mack (June 2, 1917 – January 2, 2008) was a background painter and director, known for his extensive work at Disney in the 1940s and 1950s as a background painter. He was hired for story writing at Disney in the 1950s, and worked on illustrating children's books based on the studio's films.

His first credited appearance was as the background artist for the Rite of Spring sequence in Fantasia. He worked on Song of the South, Alice in Wonderland, Peter Pan, and Lady and the Tramp. He also worked on Walt Disney's anthology television series as a background painter and writer in the late 1950s. In the 1950s he became the president of ERA Productions, a small studio which was staffed with animators who had mostly come from Disney after leaving during the strike of 1941, producing and directing animated and live action commercials for the Peterson Company, as well as work for Disney. He later went on to form Unicorn Productions, with which he continued to work on commercials, films, and theme park rides, continuing to consult for Disney into the early 1990s, when he retired.

His feature work includes directing the 1978 live-action horror film Jennifer, written by Steve Krantz. Other director credits include Rooster: Spurs of Death (1983), Swap Meet (1979), and Half a House (1979). He was the executive in charge of production for Ruby and the producer of Mara of the Wilderness.

Mack was survived by his wife, Ginni, three sons and three grandsons. His son Kevin Mack is an Academy Award–winning visual effects supervisor.

Awards 
Brice Mack was awarded the Golden Motion Picture Cartoonist award in 1987.

Filmography

References

External links

American animators
Background artists
Walt Disney Animation Studios people
1917 births
2008 deaths
Filipino emigrants to the United States